Umudalılar (also, Umudalylar and Umudallar) is a village and the least populous municipality in the Barda Rayon of Azerbaijan. It has a population of 96.

References

Populated places in Barda District